Cloete Buitendag (born 18 May 1993) is a South African cricketer. He was included in the Northern Cape squad for the 2016 Africa T20 Cup. He made his first-class debut for Northern Cape in the 2016–17 Sunfoil 3-Day Cup on 20 October 2016. He made his List A debut for Northern Cape in the 2016–17 CSA Provincial One-Day Challenge on 13 November 2016.

References

External links
 

1993 births
Living people
South African cricketers
Northern Cape cricketers
People from Tzaneen
Sportspeople from Limpopo